LOIS Builders Ltd is a Cyprus based construction company, founded in 1977 by Sotos Lois. The company is currently managing projects in all sectors of commerce, industry and services, in both private as well as public sectors. It has completed over 200 projects. In recent years, the company has commenced operations in Saudi Arabia.

Notable completed projects

The core business of the company is the undertaking of building works contracts (including restorations) both from the public and private sectors. Such projects include medical, financial and educational institutions, tourist and leisure resorts, commercial centres, office buildings and residential projects.

 Cyprus Ministry of Finance
 Tower 25, a mixed use development designed by the world renowned architect Jean Nouvel
 Cyprus Olympic Committee offices and park
 New Municipal Town Hall of Nicosia
 New Limassol Port Passenger Terminal
 Forum Private School premises and grounds
 New AUDI Terminal, showroom and garage
 Hippocrateon Private Hospital
 Mall of Engomi
 Most of the Private Tertiary Education Institutions

In addition, LOIS Builders in collaboration with its joint venture partner Phoenix Constructions, also undertakes the construction of large scale technical works such as infrastructure and road projects after successful bidding in government tenders. Among the most recent completed projects was the building of a double lane road connecting Paralimni and Derineia, a project worth €12.5 million.

International Expansion

LOIS Builders, through its subsidiary company LOIS Builders KSA, was awarded its first contract in Saudi Arabia in November 2011. Since then, the company has set up a full scale operation with Head Offices in the capital city of Riyadh. LOIS Builders first project in KSA involved the construction of a Military Airbase Facility in the outskirts of the capital Riyadh worth the equivalent of approximately $50m USD for the Aviation of the Saudi Arabia National Guard (SANG). The development included a total number of 65 buildings together with all corresponding infrastructure, covering an area of 65,000 m². The project was completed and delivered in April 2014.

References 

Construction and civil engineering companies of Cyprus
1977 establishments in Cyprus
Construction and civil engineering companies established in 1977